Ionuț Ciprian Biceanu (born 26 February 1994) is a Romanian professional footballer who plays as a midfielder for Liga I club FC Hermannstadt.

Honours
Astra Giurgiu
Cupa României runner-up: 2018–19

References

External links
 
 

1994 births
Living people
Sportspeople from Pitești
Romanian footballers
Association football midfielders
Liga I players
FC Astra Giurgiu players
Liga II players
CS Mioveni players
CS Concordia Chiajna players
FC Hermannstadt players